Steven Lawrence Kleiman (born March 31, 1942) is an American mathematician.

Professional career
Kleiman is a professor emeritus of mathematics at the Massachusetts Institute of Technology. Born in Boston, he did his undergraduate studies at MIT. He received his Ph.D. from Harvard University in 1965, after studying there with Oscar Zariski and David Mumford, and joined the MIT faculty in 1969. Kleiman held the prestigious NATO Postdoctoral Fellowship (1966-1967),  Sloan Fellowship (1968), and Guggenheim Fellowship (1979).

Contributions
Kleiman is known for his work in algebraic geometry and commutative algebra. He has made seminal contributions in motivic cohomology, moduli theory, intersection theory and enumerative geometry. A 2002 study of 891 academic collaborations in enumerative geometry and intersection theory covered by Mathematical Reviews found that he was not only the most prolific author in those areas, but also the one with the most collaborative ties, and the most central author of the field in terms of closeness centrality; the study's authors proposed to name the collaboration graph of the field in his honor.

Awards and honors
In 1989 the University of Copenhagen awarded him an honorary doctorate and in May 2002 the Norwegian Academy of Science and Letters hosted a conference in honor of his 60th birthday and elected him as a foreign member. In 1992 Kleiman was elected foreign member of the Royal Danish Academy of Sciences and Letters.

In 2012 he became a fellow of the American Mathematical Society. He was an invited speaker at the International Congress of Mathematics at Nice in 1970.

Selected publications
.
.
.
.
.
.
.

See also
Cone of curves (Kleiman-Mori cone)
Kleiman's theorem

References

External links

1942 births
Living people
20th-century American mathematicians
21st-century American mathematicians
Algebraic geometers
Massachusetts Institute of Technology School of Science faculty
Harvard University alumni
Members of the Norwegian Academy of Science and Letters
Fellows of the American Mathematical Society
Massachusetts Institute of Technology alumni
Mathematicians from Massachusetts